Maurice FitzGerald Day  (20 May 1816 – 13 December 1904) was a Church of Ireland bishop in the last quarter of the 19th century.

Day was born at Kiltallagh, County Kerry, to J. Day, rector of Kiltallagh, and his wife Arabella, daughter of Sir William Godfrey. He was educated at Clonmel Endowed School and Trinity College, Dublin and ordained in 1840. He was the incumbent of St Matthias, Dublin from 1843 to 1868 when he became Dean of Limerick. He was Bishop of Cashel, Emly, Waterford and Lismore from 1872 until his retirement in 1899. He died on 13 December 1904.

References

  

1816 births
1904 deaths
People from Clonmel
People educated at Clonmel Endowed School
Alumni of Trinity College Dublin
19th-century Anglican bishops in Ireland
Deans of Limerick
Bishops of Cashel and Waterford